John Oliver Kidd (born 15 January 1936) is an English former footballer, who played as a forward in the Football League for Tranmere Rovers.

References

External links

Tranmere Rovers F.C. players
Everton F.C. players
Association football forwards
English Football League players
1936 births
Living people
People from Birkenhead
English footballers